Fauzia Nasreen (born 6 December 1950) is a Pakistani diplomat and teacher.

Career 
Nasreen entered the Foreign Service of Pakistan in 1973. She was posted to the Pakistani embassies in Iran, Malaysia, the Philippines and Italy and rose to be her country's ambassador to Nepal, Poland and the Czech Republic. She was also her country's High Commissioner in Australia from November 2009, with concurrent accreditation to Fiji. Since she ceased being a diplomat, she has been teaching in Pakistan and serves as an advisor at COMSATS University.

References

Living people
1950 births
Ambassadors of Pakistan to the Czech Republic
Ambassadors of Pakistan to Nepal
Ambassadors of Pakistan to Poland
Academic staff of COMSATS University Islamabad
High Commissioners of Pakistan to Australia
High Commissioners of Pakistan to Fiji
Pakistani expatriates in Iran
Pakistani expatriates in Italy
Pakistani expatriates in Malaysia
Pakistani expatriates in the Philippines
Pakistani women ambassadors